"The Return of the Los Palmas 7" is a song by British ska/pop band Madness, written by Mike Barson, Mark Bedford and Daniel Woodgate. The single reached number 7 in the UK and remained in the charts for 11 weeks. The single release is slightly different from the track on the album Absolutely, upon which it is listed as "Return of the Los Palmas 7" and is approximately 30 seconds shorter.

The song is mainly instrumental, except for some ad-libbing by Chas Smash at the beginning, the sound of "Waiter!" approximately 42 seconds into the track and "Good night!" at the very end. Dave Robinson, head of Stiff Records, was keen on Madness recording another instrumental track, especially after the success of "One Step Beyond...". The resulting song was not as ska-influenced as were their earlier songs, but was played heavily on BBC Radio 2. This helped Madness gain a new generation of older fans.

Music video
The single's music video was filmed in January 1981 at the Venus Cafe, 95 Golborne Road, London W10 5NL, and at Kenwood Park, North London.

The video mainly features the band in the cafe, switching between a greasy-spoon scene and an elegant restaurant scene. In the middle of the video, the band are shown dressed as cowboys in Kenwood Park. These three scenarios are interspersed between random clips, which comprise the bulk of the video, as it was created just two weeks before the single's release. Some of these clips are also included in the video for the Bob Marley song "One Love", which includes guest appearances by Suggs and Chas Smash.

The song is incorrectly titled "Return to the Los Palmos 7" in the credit block, appearing both at the head and tail of the video.

The clips that are interspersed throughout the video are chronologically summarised below.

Clips used

Appearances
In addition to its single release and appearance on the album Absolutely, "The Return of the Los Palmas 7" also appears on the Madness collections Divine Madness (a.k.a. The Heavy Heavy Hits), Complete Madness, It's... Madness Too, The Business, Our House and Ultimate Collection.

Formats and track listings
These are the formats and track listings of major single releases of "The Return of the Los Palmas 7".

7" vinyl single

12" vinyl single
Included with the 12" single was a copy of the first edition of "The Nutty Boys" comic. The demo version of "My Girl" is notable for being the first officially released Madness track to feature a lead vocal by Mike Barson; it would take another 28 years before a second Barson vocal track was released on the "Sugar and Spice" download single.

Charts

Certifications and sales

References

External links

1981 singles
Madness (band) songs
1980s instrumentals
Songs written by Mike Barson
Songs written by Mark Bedford
Songs written by Dan Woodgate
1980 songs
Stiff Records singles
Song recordings produced by Clive Langer
Song recordings produced by Alan Winstanley